Nameless Lake may refer to one of several lakes in Canada:

Nameless Lake (Manitoulin District), Ontario
Nameless Lake (Sudbury District), Ontario